Text format may refer to:
Computing
 Formatted text, text containing word processor metadata for control style

Graphic design
 Typesetting, the style of text on a page
 Typography, the style of text characters
 Calligraphy, the style of hand-rendered text characters